Live at Blossom is the first live concert video by Donnie Iris, recorded and originally released in 1981. The concert was recorded at Blossom Music Center, when the band opened for the Michael Stanley Band.

Track listing 
 "Agnes"
 "That's The Way Love Ought To Be"
 "King Cool"
 "Sweet Merilee"
 "I Can't Hear You"
 "Broken Promises"
 "Love Is Like a Rock"
 "Ah! Leah!"

Personnel 
 Donnie Iris - lead vocals, rhythm guitars
 Mark Avsec - keyboards, background vocals
 Marty Lee Hoenes - guitars, background vocals
 Albritton McClain - bass, background vocals
 Kevin Valentine - drums

Re-release 
To celebrate the 25th anniversary of the concert, Live at Blossom was finally released onto DVD in 2006. It contained the same track listing as above, plus the music video for the band's new song Little Black Dress (from the Ellwood City album).

Formats available 
 VHS
 DVD

References 

Donnie Iris albums
1981 live albums
Live video albums
1981 video albums